Thomas B. Turner (1902 – September 22, 2002) was an American microbiologist who worked as the dean of the Johns Hopkins School of Medicine from 1957 to 1968.

Early life and education 
Turner was born in Prince Frederick, Maryland. He earned a Bachelor of Science degree from St. John's College from the University of Maryland School of Medicine.

Career 
Turner joined the Johns Hopkins School of Medicine in the 1920s and remained at the university until 1968. During his final eleven he worked as dean of the medical school. During World War II, Turner briefly left Johns Hopkins to manage the United States Army's syphilis eradication program. In the 1980s, Turner became the founding director of the Alcoholic Beverage Medical Research Foundation at Johns Hopkins.

References

American microbiologists
Johns Hopkins University faculty
2002 deaths
1902 births

People from Prince Frederick, Maryland
St. John's College (Annapolis/Santa Fe) alumni
University of Maryland School of Medicine alumni
University of Maryland, Baltimore alumni
United States Army personnel of World War II
Johns Hopkins School of Medicine faculty